Shu-Fang Lai is an academic and author who specialises Victorian literature and periodicals, especially the work of Charles Dickens.  She is a professor at National Sun Yat-Sen University in Taiwan.

From 2017 to 2019, she was a research fellow at the Institute for Advanced Studies in the Humanities at the University of Edinburgh where she researched Robert Chambers and his  Edinburgh Journal.

Works

Books
 The Land of Story-Books: Scottish Children’s Literature in the Long Nineteenth Century (2019)
 How We Became Posthuman： Virtual Bodies in Cybernetics, Literature, and Informatics (2018)
 Victorian Fancy (2013)
 Charles Reade, George Meredith and Harriet Martineau as Serial Writers of Once a Week (1859-1865) (2008)

References

External links
 Ten Minutes with ... Prof. Shu-Fang Lai – interview by the International Association for the Study of Scottish Literatures

Academic staff of the National Sun Yat-sen University
Year of birth missing (living people)
Living people